Babikov (masculine) or Babikova (feminine) is a Russian surname. Notable people with the surname include:

Anton Babikov (born 1991), Russian biathlete
Ivan Babikov (born 1980), Russian-born Canadian cross-country skier
Sergey Babikov, Tajikistani sport shooter

Russian-language surnames